"Like Dreamers Do" is a song by British singer Mica Paris which features jazz musician Courtney Pine. It was released as the second single from Paris' debut album, So Good (1988), by 4th & B'way Records. The song peaked at number 26 on the UK Singles Chart.

Critical reception
Pan-European magazine Music & Media described "Like Dreamers Do" as a "mid-tempo jazzy single from this promising young singer". James Hamilton from Record Mirror wrote in his dance column, "Huskily and quite jazzily sung tumbling and tapping bpm breezy swinger featuring Courtney Pine's squealing sax and some gospel-ish insistently repetitive title line chorus support".

Track listing
 7" vinyl
A. "Like Dreamers Do"
B. "Wicked"

 12" vinyl
A. "Like Dreamers Do" (The Freeway Mix)
B1. "Like Dreamers Do"
B2. "Wicked"

 CD single
 "Like Dreamers Do" (Radio Mix) 		
 "Like Dreamers Do" (The Freeway Mix) 		
 "Like Dreamers Do" (The Rebirth of Cool Mix) 		
 "Wicked"

Charts

References

Songs about dreams
Mica Paris songs
1988 singles
1988 songs
Island Records singles
4th & B'way Records singles
Funk songs